The Republic of Poland Ambassador to North Macedonia is Poland's foremost representative in North Macedonia. He is also official representative of the President and Government of Poland to the President and Government of North Macedonia.

As with all Polish ambassadors, Poland Ambassador to North Macedonia serves at the pleasure of the President and enjoys full diplomatic immunity.

Embassy of Poland is located in the capital of Skopje, additionally there is Honorary Consulate located in Ohrid.

History 
During the dissolution of the Yugoslavia, its constituent Socialist Republic of Macedonia organised independence referendum which resulted that Macedonia became an independent country. Poland established diplomatic relations with Macedonia in 1993 however until 1997 there was no Polish diplomatic mission in North Macedonia. In 1996 Poland opened its embassy in Skopje with Władysław Bilut as chargé d'affairs. Bilateral relations between two countries are good which is connected with memorable aid given by Polish nation during 1963 Skopje earthquake, also since Macedonia gained independence Poland supports Macedonian aspirations to join European Union.

List of ambassadors of Poland to North Macedonia 

 1997–2000: Władysław Bilut (chargé d’affaires)
 2000–2006: Andrzej Dobrzyński (until 2003 as chargé d’affaires)
 2006–2007: Grzegorz Mazek (chargé d’affaires)
 2007–2011: Karol Bachura
 2011–2013: Przemysław Czyż
 2014–2018: Jacek Multanowski
 since 2018: Wojciech Tyciński

References 

North Macedonia
Ambassadors of Poland to North Macedonia
Poland